Ricardo Iribarren (born November 2, 1967 in Berisso, Argentina) is an Argentine footballer who played for a number of teams in Argentina, Ecuador, and United States .

Iribarren played in the Argentine Primera for Estudiantes (1985–1990 / 1991–1994) and Belgrano de Córdoba (1994/1996).
Iribarren played in Ecuador for LDU Quito in the first semester of 1991.
In 1996, he played for Columbus Crew in Major League Soccer. He returned to Argentina in 1997 where he played for Almagro. Then returned to United States to MLS to play for Columbus Crew and with FC Dallas and in the United Soccer League with Pittsburgh Riverhounds.

After retiring with the Pittsburgh Riverhounds in 2003, he coached the team until 2006.

In 2006, he coached high school soccer at the American School Foundation in Mexico City. Ricardo led the ASF soccer team to two undefeated varsity soccer finals in the local league, a first and third place in the ASOMEX tournament, and the junior varsity team to a first place in the local league. In 2008, he led the junior varsity in an almost perfect season with a score of 7–0 and lost the finals in penalties.

The Columbus Crew hired Ricardo Iribarren on January 22, 2009 as an assistant coach, reuniting him with former teammates Robert Warzycha and Brian Bliss.

Ricardo Iribarren was called as assistant coach to the Argentina National Team during the 2014 World Cup leading them to second place. 

Ricardo Iribarren is married to Evie and they have three children: Milena (32), Blas (30), and Jeremias (21). And has three grandsons, Enzo, Kenzo, and Luca. Kenzo Iribarren is following in his grandfather’s footsteps and currently playing soccer in Miami, Florida.

External links

 

 Statistics at FutbolXXI.com 
 All-Time MLS Player Register

References

1967 births
Living people
Sportspeople from Buenos Aires Province
Argentine footballers
Estudiantes de La Plata footballers
Club Atlético Belgrano footballers
Club Almagro players
L.D.U. Quito footballers
FC Dallas players
Columbus Crew players
Pittsburgh Riverhounds SC players
Expatriate footballers in Chile
Expatriate footballers in Ecuador
Major League Soccer players
Milwaukee Rampage players
A-League (1995–2004) players
Columbus Crew non-playing staff
Pittsburgh Riverhounds SC coaches
Association football defenders
Argentine football managers